King Fahd Mosque or King Fahad Mosque may refer to:

 King Fahd Mosque (Edinburgh) or Edinburgh Central Mosque, Scotland
 King Fahd Mosque (Sarajevo), Bosnia and Herzegovina
 King Fahad Mosque (Culver City, California), U.S.
 King Fahd Islamic Cultural Center, Buenos Aires, Argentina
 Ibrahim-al-Ibrahim Mosque, also known as the King Fahd bin Abdulaziz al-Saud Mosque, Gibraltar

See also

King Fahd (disambiguation)